The following is a list of works that were published posthumously. 

An asterisk indicates the author is listed in multiple subsections. (For example, Philip Sidney appears in four.)

Literature

Novels and short stories 
 Douglas Adams* — The Salmon of Doubt (an incomplete novel, but also essays)
 James Agee — A Death in the Family (initial publication assembled by David McDowell; alternate assembly later published by Michael Lofaro)
 Shmuel Yosef Agnon — Shira
 Louisa May Alcott — A Long Fatal Love Chase
 Horatio Alger — over thirty-five short novels after his death in 1899
 Isaac Asimov — Forward the Foundation
 Jane Austen — Northanger Abbey, Persuasion, Sanditon, and Lady Susan
 William Baldwin — Beware the Cat
 L. Frank Baum — The Magic of Oz and Glinda of Oz
 John Bellairs — The Ghost in the Mirror, The Vengeance of the Witch-finder, The Drum, the Doll, and the Zombie and The Doom of the Haunted Opera (all with Brad Strickland)
 Cyrano de Bergerac — The Other World: The States and Empires of the Moon and The States and Empires of the Sun
 Marlon Brando and Donald Cammell — Fan Tan (with David Thomson)
 Roberto Bolaño — 2666, A Little Lumpen Novelita, The Secret of Evil, The Third Reich, and Woes of the True Policeman
 Richard Brautigan — An Unfortunate Woman: A Journey
 Charlotte Brontë — The Professor
 Charles Bukowski* — over twenty books of poetry and short stories after his death in 1994
 Mikhail Bulgakov — The Master and Margarita
 Edgar Rice Burroughs — John Carter of Mars, Tarzan and the Tarzan Twins, Tarzan and the Madman, Tarzan and the Castaways, Tarzan: The Lost Adventure, Savage Pellucidar, The Wizard of Venus, I am a Barbarian, Minidoka: 937th Earl of One Mile Series M, Pirate Blood, Forgotten Tales of Love and Murder, Brother Men
 William S. Burroughs and Jack Kerouac — And the Hippos Were Boiled in Their Tanks
 Octavia E. Butler — Seed to Harvest
 Samuel Butler — The Way of All Flesh
 Albert Camus* — A Happy Death, The First Man
 Xueqin Cao (trad.) — Dream of the Red Chamber
 Angela Carter* — American Ghosts and Old World Wonders, Burning Your Boats (including six previously unpublished short stories)
 Raymond Chandler — Poodle Springs (with Robert B. Parker)
 Bruce Chatwin* — Anatomy of Restlessness (a collection of short stories and travel tales, as well as essays and articles)
 Geoffrey Chaucer* — The Canterbury Tales
 Agatha Christie* — Sleeping Murder and notebooks
 Tom Clancy — Command Authority (with Mark Greaney)
 Wilkie Collins — Blind Love (with Walter Besant)
 Joseph Conrad — Suspense: A Napoleonic Novel
 Robert Cormier — The Rag and Bone Shop
 Hannah Crafts — The Bondwoman's Narrative
 Stephen Crane — The O'Ruddy (with Robert Barr)
 Michael Crichton — Pirate Latitudes, Micro, Dragon Teeth
 René Daumal — Mount Analogue
 James De Mille — A Strange Manuscript Found in a Copper Cylinder
 Michael Dibdin — End Games
 Philip K. Dick — Gather Yourselves Together, Radio Free Albemuth, Humpty Dumpty in Oakland, Voices from the Street
 Charles Dickens — The Mystery of Edwin Drood
 Benjamin Disraeli — Falconet
 Siobhan Dowd — Bog Child, Solace of the Road
 Gardner Dozois — Book of Magic (editor), City Under the Stars (with Michael Swanwick)
 Alexandre Dumas — The Knight of Sainte-Hermine (with Claude Schopp)
 G.B. Edwards — The Book of Ebenezer Le Page 
 E. R. Eddison — The Mezentian Gate
 Harlan Ellison — Blood’s a Rover
 Ralph Ellison — Juneteenth, Three Days Before the Shooting... 
 Hans Fallada — Every Man Dies Alone
 Louise Fitzhugh — Sport
 F. Scott Fitzgerald — The Last Tycoon
 Gustave Flaubert* — Bouvard et Pécuchet
 Ian Fleming — Chitty-Chitty-Bang-Bang, The Man with the Golden Gun, Octopussy and The Living Daylights
 C. S. Forester — Hornblower and the Crisis, "The Last Encounter", Gold from Crete, The Pursued
 E. M. Forster — Maurice
 William Gaddis — Agapē Agape
 Romain Gary* — Vie et Mort d'Émile Ajar, L'homme à la Colombe, L'orage
 Hugo Gernsback — Ultimate World
 William Golding — The Double Tongue
 René Goscinny — Asterix in Belgium (with Albert Uderzo)
 H. Rider Haggard — The Treasure of the Lake, Allan and the Ice-gods, Mary of Marion Isle, Belshazzar
 Alex Haley — Queen: The Story of an American Family (with David Stevens)
 Kenneth Halliwell — Lord Cucumber and The Boy Hairdresser (with Joe Orton)
 Jean Harlow — Today is Tonight (with Carey Wilson)
 E. Lynn Harris — Mama Dearest
 Jaroslav Hašek — The Glorious Licking Continues (Pokračování slavného výprasku), the unfinished fourth volume of The Good Soldier Švejk
 Robert A. Heinlein — For Us, the Living, Variable Star (with Spider Robinson), The Pursuit of the Pankera
 Joseph Heller — Portrait of an Artist, as an Old Man
 Ernest Hemingway* — Islands in the Stream, The Garden of Eden, True at First Light, The Dangerous Summer, and Under Kilimanjaro
 Frank Herbert — High-Opp, Angels' Fall, A Game of Authors, A Thorn in the Bush
 Hergé — Tintin and Alph-Art (assembled by Benoît Peeters, Michel Bareau, and Jean-Manuel Duvivier)
 Winifred Holtby — South Riding (with Vera Brittain)
 Robert E. Howard — A Gent from Bear Creek, Almuric
 Deborah Howe — Bunnicula: A Rabbit-Tale of Mystery
 Shirley Jackson — "Paranoia" (short story)
 Brian Jacques — The Rogue Crew
 Tove Jansson — The True Deceiver and Traveling Light, et al.
 Alfred Jarry — Exploits and Opinions of Dr. Faustroll, Pataphysician
 W. E. Johns — Biggles Does Some Homework, Biggles: Air Ace
 Robert Jordan — The Gathering Storm, Towers of Midnight, and A Memory of Light (all with Brandon Sanderson) 
 Franz Kafka — The Trial, The Castle, and Amerika, as well as many short stories
 Giuseppe Tomasi di Lampedusa* — The Leopard
 Stieg Larsson — The Girl with the Dragon Tattoo, The Girl Who Played with Fire, and The Girl Who Kicked the Hornets' Nest
 John le Carré — Silverview
 Ursula K. Le Guin — Firelight, The Daughter of Odren, Pity and Shame
 Fritz Leiber — The Dealings of Daniel Kesserich
 Édouard Levé — Suicide 
 Jack London — Jerry of the Islands, Michael, Brother of Jerry, The Red One, Hearts of Three, The Assassination Bureau, Ltd (with Robert L. Fish)
 Huey Long — My First Days in the White House
 Robert Ludlum — The Janson Directive
 Katherine Mansfield — The Doves' Nest
 William March — Poor Pilgrim, Poor Stranger, 99 Fables
 Bruce Marshall — An Account of Capers
 George du Maurier — The Martian
 Anne McCaffrey — Sky Dragons (with Todd McCaffrey)
 Michael McDowell — Candles Burning
 James A. Michener — Matecumbe
 Walter M. Miller Jr. — Saint Leibowitz and the Wild Horse Woman (with Terry Bisson)
 Yukio Mishima — The Decay of the Angel
 Margaret Mitchell — Lost Laysen
 Vladimir Nabokov — The Original of Laura
 Irène Némirovsky — Suite française
 Frank Norris — The Pit: A Story of Chicago, Vandover and the Brute
 Patrick O'Brian — The Final Unfinished Voyage of Jack Aubrey
 Flann O'Brien — The Third Policeman
 Robert C. O'Brien — Z for Zachariah (with Sally M. Conly and Jane Leslie Conly) 
 Joe Orton — Head to Toe, Lord Cucumber, and The Boy Hairdresser (the latter two with Kenneth Halliwell)
 Robert B. Parker — Split Image
 Mervyn Peake — Titus Awakes
 Petronius — Satyricon
 Edgar Allan Poe* — The Light-House
 Karel Poláček — There Were Five of Us (Czech: Bylo nás pět)
 Jan Potocki — The Manuscript Found in Saragossa
 Terry Pratchett — The Shepherd's Crown, The Long Utopia, The Long Cosmos (the latter two with Stephen Baxter)
 Mario Puzo — Omertà; The Family
 Arthur Ransome — Coots in the North
 Dr. Seuss — Daisy-Head Mayzie, My Many Colored Days, Hooray for Diffendoofer Day! (with Jack Prelutsky), What Pet Should I Get?
 Yaakov Shabtai — Past Perfect
 M. P. Shiel — The New King
 Nevil Shute — Trustee from the Toolroom
 Philip Sidney* — The Countess of Pembroke's Arcadia
 Shel Silverstein* — Runny Babbit
 Thorne Smith — The Passionate Witch (with Norman H. Matson)
 Theodore Sturgeon — Godbody
 James Tiptree Jr. — Come Live With Me, Backward, Turn Backward, The Earth Doth Like a Snake Renew
 J. R. R. Tolkien — The Silmarillion (assembled by Christopher Tolkien), The Children of Húrin (published 35 years after his death; also assembled by Christopher Tolkien). Other posthumous publications can be found here.
 Leo Tolstoy* — Hadji Murat
 John Kennedy Toole — A Confederacy of Dunces, The Neon Bible
 Mark Twain — The Mysterious Stranger
 Jules Verne — The Lighthouse at the End of the World, The Golden Volcano, The Thompson Travel Agency, The Chase of the Golden Meteor, The Danube Pilot, The Survivors of the "Jonathan", The Secret of Wilhelm Storitz, "The Eternal Adam", The Barsac Mission, Paris in the Twentieth Century, Backwards to Britain
 Kurt Vonnegut* — Armageddon in Retrospect, Look at the Birdie, Sucker's Portfolio, While Mortals Sleep
 David Foster Wallace — The Pale King (assembled by Michael Pietsch)
 Edward Lewis Wallant — The Tenants of Moonbloom, The Children at the Gate
 Edward Noyes Westcott — David Harum (published version assembled by Ripley Hitchcock)
 Donald E. Westlake — Memory
 Thomas Wolfe — The Web and the Rock, You Can't Go Home Again, The Hounds of Darkness, The Hills Beyond (all assembled by Maxwell Perkins and Edward Aswell)
 Mary Wollstonecraft — Maria: or, The Wrongs of Woman (later chapters assembled by William Godwin)
 Virginia Woolf —  Between the Acts
 John Wyndham — Web, Exiles on Asperus, No Place Like Earth
 Roger Zelazny — Donnerjack, Lord Demon (with Jane Lindskold)

Plays 
 Angela Carter* — The Curious Room (also scripts)
 Federico García Lorca* — The House of Bernarda Alba,  The Public 
 Alexander Griboyedov — Woe from Wit, A Georgian Night
 Sarah Kane — 4.48 Psychosis
 Philip Sidney* — The Lady of May
 Leo Tolstoy* — The Living Corpse

Poetry 
 Richard Beckinsale — With Love
 Charles Bukowski* — over twenty books of poetry and short stories
 Emily Dickinson* — virtually all of her poems
 Federico García Lorca* — Diván del Tamarit, Poet in New York, Yerma, Sonnets of Dark Love
 Mikhail Lermontov — Demon, The Princess of the Tide, Valerik
 Christopher Marlowe — Hero and Leander (with George Chapman), The Passionate Shepherd to His Love
 Thomas Overbury — A Wife, Characters, The Remedy of Love, Observations in Foreign Travels
 Wilfred Owen — almost all of his poems, the first edition being 24 Poems (1920)
 Persius — Satires
 Sylvia Plath — Ariel, Ennui
 Edgar Allan Poe* — The Bells, Annabel Lee, Alone, An Acrostic
 Philip Sidney* — Astrophel and Stella
 Shel Silverstein* — Every Thing On It
 Virgil — Aeneid
 Đoàn Thị Điểm — Nữ Trung Tùng Phận

Non-fiction

Autobiographies, biographies, memoirs, diaries and letters 
The best-known writings of Holocaust victims are listed here, but for a more complete catalog, see List of posthumous publications of Holocaust victims.
 Julius Caesar — Commentarii de Bello Civili
 Hélène Berr — The Journal of Hélène Berr
 Agatha Christie* — Agatha Christie: An Autobiography
 Rachel Corrie — Let Me Stand Alone
 Adam Czerniaków — The Warsaw Diary of Adam Czerniakow: Prelude to Doom
 Emily Dickinson* — her letters
 Verrier Elwin — The Tribal World of Verrier Elwin
 Richard Feynman — What Do You Care What Other People Think?
 Moshe Flinker — Young Moshe's Diary: The Spiritual Torment of a Jewish Boy in Nazi Europe
 Anne Frank — The Diary of a Young Girl
 Julius Fučík — Notes from the Gallows
 Frankie Gaye — Marvin Gaye: My Brother
 Petr Ginz — The Diary of Petr Ginz
 Archibald Gracie IV — The Truth About the Titanic (assembled and published by Mitchell Kennerley)
 Ernest Hemingway* — A Moveable Feast
 Etty Hillesum — An Interrupted Life: The Diaries of Etty Hillesum, 1941-1943
 David Koker — At the Edge of the Abyss: A Concentration Camp Diary, 1943-1944
 Janusz Korczak — Ghetto Diary
 Sergei Kourdakov — The Persecutor (autobiography)
 Rutka Laskier — Rutka's Notebook
 Kim Malthe-Bruun — Heroic Heart: The Diary and Letters of Kim Malthe-Bruun (titled Kim in Denmark)
 Manning Marable — Malcolm X: A Life of Reinvention
 Eliot Ness — The Untouchables (with Oscar Fraley)
 Pliny the Younger — Letters, Book Ten (to and from the Roman Emperor Trajan)
 Oskar Rosenfeld —  In the Beginning Was the Ghetto: Notebooks from Lodz
 Yitskhok Rudashevski —  Diary of the Vilna Ghetto
 Philip Slier — Hidden Letters
 Malcolm X — The Autobiography of Malcolm X (with Alex Haley)

Philosophy 
 Marcus Aurelius — Meditations
 Walter Benjamin — Theses on the Philosophy of History, Arcades Project (assembled by Rolf Tiedemann; translated by Howard Eiland and Kevin McLaughlin)
 David Hume — Dialogues Concerning Natural Religion
 Edmund Husserl — Experience and Judgment (edited by Ludwig Landgrebe)
 Martin Heidegger — Contributions to Philosophy, Insight Into What Is
 Søren Kierkegaard — The Point of View of My Work as an Author, Writing Sampler, Judge for Yourselves!
 Gottfried Wilhelm Leibniz — The Monadology
 Friedrich Nietzsche — The Will to Power (assembled by Elisabeth Förster-Nietzsche and Heinrich Köselitz)
 Baruch Spinoza — Ethics
 Ludwig Wittgenstein — Philosophical Investigations (edited and translated by G. E. M. Anscombe)

Other non-fiction 
 Georgius Agricola — De re metallica
 Douglas Adams* — The Salmon of Doubt (essays, as well as an incomplete novel)
 Albert Camus* — nine publications of notebooks and collected essays
 Geoffrey Chaucer* — A Treatise on the Astrolabe
 Carl von Clausewitz — On War
 Bruce Chatwin* — Photographs and Notebooks, Anatomy of Restlessness (a collection of essays and articles, as well as short stories and travel tales), Winding Paths
 Roald Dahl — Roald Dahl's Guide to Railway Safety
 David James Davies — Towards Welsh Freedom
 Gustave Flaubert* — Dictionary of Received Ideas
 Wilson Follett — Follett's Modern American Usage
 Gabriel García Márquez — The Scandal of the Century: Selected Journalistic Writings, 1950–1984
 Romain Gary — L'affaire Homme
 Lauren Grandcolas — You Can Do It!: The Merit Badge Handbook for Grown-Up Girls
 C. L. R. James — American Civilization
 Humphrey Jennings — Pandaemonium, 1660-1886: The Coming of the Machine as Seen by Contemporary Observer
 Joseph Joubert — Recueil des pensées de M. Joubert
 Carl Jung — The Red Book
 Giuseppe Tomasi di Lampedusa* — Stories, Lessons on Stendhal, Introduction to Sixteenth Century French Literature
 Niccolò Machiavelli — The Prince
 Barbara Olson — The Final Days: The Last, Desperate Abuses of Power by the Clinton White House
 Thomas Overbury — Observations in Foreign Travels
 Carl Sagan —  Billions and Billions
 Philip Sidney* — An Apology for Poetry
 Edmund Spenser — A View of the Present State of Ireland
 Kurt Vonnegut* — Armageddon in Retrospect, Sucker's Portfolio (essays and short stories)

See also 
 Unfinished work
 List of films released posthumously
 List of music released posthumously
 List of television performers who died during production
 List of entertainers who died during a performance

 
Literature lists